Carnide is a civil parish in the municipality of Pombal, Portugal.  The population in 2011 was 1,647, in an area of 22.93 km².

References

Parishes of Pombal, Portugal